The  Chirinda Forest Botanical Reserve is situated on the slopes of Mount Selinda,  south of Chipinge, in the Chipinge Highlands of Manicaland, Zimbabwe, and is administered by the Forestry Commission. The headwaters of three streams, namely the Zona, Chinyika and Musangazi, drain the two broad highlands which it encloses. The boundaries of the reserve are not strictly enforced, so that cattle grazing and plant harvesting are ongoing. The reserve is surrounded by communal settlements, commercial timber plantations (eucalypts and pines) and small-scale commercial farming units. The naturalist Charles Swynnerton was appointed manager of the nearby Gungunyana farm in 1900, and a number of plant, bird and insect names commemorate his collecting activities of the next two decades. Chirinda means "lookout" or "vantage point" in the chiNdau language, or perhaps "place of refuge".

Ecology
The medium altitude forest is likely the southernmost patch of subtropical rainforest in Africa. Phytogeographically it is classed as Afromontane forest, but with lowland and Guineo-Congolian elements. It is situated on two hill tops on dolerite-derived soils, and Müller (1991) proposed that these soil types determine its extent. Goldsmith (1876) however suggested that it is only a relic of a once much larger forest which has been reduced by gradual climatic changes in a few hundred years.

Year-round moisture, in the form of rain, mist or dew, provides for a substantial and intact moist leaf litter layer, on which its ecological processes depend. Decomposition is fungal, and not by termites or similar insects as would be the case in drier woodlands of the region. Several tree species bear fleshy fruit, resulting in a good representation of mammal and bird frugivores, which impact both negatively and positively on seed dispersal. Much of the fauna shows affinities to forests elsewhere, particularly those at lower altitudes along the East Africa coastal plains.

Protection
Protection from fires is expected to facilitate the regeneration and expansion of the forest. During his time of residence, Swynnerton noted that recurring fires had been gradually reducing outlying forest patches. Destruction of portions of the Chipete and Chipungambira satellite forest patches occurred during the 1860s. It may have been aided by elephants which opened up forest, but more likely resulted from indigenous people who regularly cleared land by fire in spring time. Fire-resistant mobola plum and mahobohobo trees are pioneer species in such areas.

Maupare (1993) however noted that the forest boundary was stable and that former logging operations in the northern section had no lasting effect on the plant diversity. This extraction of red mahogany, peawood and tannodia during the 1940s also had little effect on its extent.

Flora and fauna

The area is home to a high diversity of plants, fungi, birds, butterflies, insects and reptiles.

Flora
Rare tree species which seldom occur elsewhere in Zimbabwe include the fluted milkwood (dominant canopy species), Chirinda fig, undershrub big-leaf, Chirinda stinkwood, yellow bitterberry and forest strychnos. The type of the latter species was obtained in the forest by Swynnerton.

The dominant canopy species, besides fluted milkwood, are forest mahogany and peawood. The sub-canopy is occupied by tannodia, forest strychnos and forest ironplum. The Big Tree grows in the southern part of the reserve in the "Valley of the Giants". It is the largest red mahogany tree in southern Africa and the tallest native tree in Zimbabwe. The 600- to 1,000-year-old (some estimate 2,000-year-old) leviathan has a trunk diameter of about 6 metres. Other forest tree species include colossal specimens of strangling figs, brown mahogany, white stinkwood, forest climbing acacia, ironwood, giant diospyros, apricot vine, forest peach, forest rothmannia, strombosia and forest toad-tree. The forest edge is characterized by smooth-barked flat-crown, forest num-num, forest sword-leaf, horsewood, forest croton, climbing turkey-berry, Manica bride's bush, green flower tree, small-fruited teclea, elbow-leaf, mitzeerie, eastern blue-bush, magic guarri, orange-milk tree, lavender tree, mobola plum, wild currant and climbing orange are common species of the surrounding savannah.

Thousands of specimens of the yucca-like Dracaena fragrans populate the forest floor, and numerous ferns, creepers, vines, epiphytes and orchids (including Calanthe sylvatica) are to be found. Montbretia and flame lilies are also present, while guava, lantana and ginger are exotic invasive species.

Fauna

Mammals
Samango monkeys are regularly seen, and leopard on the odd occasion. The local races of the mutable sun squirrel (H. m. chirindensis) and red-bellied coast squirrel (i.e. Selinda mountain squirrel, P. p. swynnertoni) are mountain isolates. The Selinda veld rat occurs in tangled vegetation on rocky areas, and is only known from two other sites in Zimbabwe.

Birds

A few highland bird species reach their southernmost occurrence here, namely the Chirinda apalis (type locality), Swynnerton's robin, a globally threatened monotypic genus, stripe-cheeked greenbul (A. m. disjunctus), moustached warbler (M. m. orientalis), white-tailed flycatcher and yellow-bellied waxbill.  Wide-ranging African species include crowned eagle, trumpeter and silvery-cheeked hornbills, both breeders, Livingstone's turaco, lemon dove, green pigeon, owls, nightjars, bee-eaters, pygmy kingfisher, yellow-streaked (P. f. dendrophilus) and  sombre greenbuls, yellow-throated (S. r. alacris), Barratt's (B. b. priesti) and broad-tailed warblers, olive and black-fronted bushshrikes, Cape batis, sunbirds and firefinches. Various bird races were first described from this location: a strikingly coloured race of red-necked spurfowl (P. a. swynnertoni), a fulvous-coloured race of wailing cisticola (C. l. mashona), a race of bar-throated apalis (A. t. arnoldi), the smallish, dusky and streaky-throated Swynnerton's thrush (T. o. swynnertoni) which is endemic to the Eastern Highlands, and a race of olive sunbird (C. o. sclateri). The forest is situated too low for orange thrush, Roberts's warbler, malachite or bronze sunbirds, and too high for yellow-spotted nicator, white-eared barbet or grey waxbill. Crested guineafowl however inhabits its lower elevations and green malkoha recently populated the forest from lower altitudes. Blue-mantled flycatchers occupy the lower altitudes or fringing thickets, but remain segregated from white-tailed flycatchers which occupy the forest proper or higher canopy.

Reptiles
The reptile fauna includes pythons, cobras, vipers, mambas, adders, chameleons, geckos, skinks and lizards. Marshall's leaf chameleon, an endemic of the Eastern Highlands, is found within the forest and along its margins. The type species C. swynnertoni of the worm lizard genus Chirindia was described from this locality, while another worm lizard, Zygaspis ferox, is endemic to the forest and its vicinity.

Amphibians
The types of Broadley's forest treefrog, Hewitt's long-nosed frog and the Chirinda toad were obtained in the forest. The Chirinda toad is known from Chirinda and the forest north of Dombé in adjacent Mozambique. It is a terrestrial species that lives on leaf-litter, and takes refuge under rotten logs.

Insects
The Mount Selinda acraea mimic butterfly (Mimacraea neokoton) is found nowhere else. The type of the ebony bush brown was obtained from Chirinda forest, and it is also known from the Vumba. It flies all year and has distinct seasonal forms. The Chirinda bush brown is named for the forest, but it is in fact a widespread species. Its type was obtained at an unknown location in the Eastern Highlands, and it is distinguished from the previous species by its lighter upperside ground colour, and the contrasting hair-pencils of the male.

Facilities
The well-marked route to the campsite leaves the main road just east of the mission hospital in Mount Selinda. It is located 4 km into the forest, and also has chalets with clean facilities and braai stands.

Site locations

 Big Tree, Valley of the Giants 
 Chipete forest 
 Chirinda forest campsite 
 Gungunyana farm 
 Swynnerton memorial

See also
 Allophylus chirindensis
 Anthene chirinda
 Chirinda wild medlar
 Neoceratitis chirinda
 Plectranthus swynnertonii, type locality
 Rhus chirindensis
 Reptiles and frogs of the Eastern Highlands

References

Further reading
 Armitage FB (1965). Project Document: Chirinda Forest. Forestry Commission (Ref. 784/FBA/EHC), Gungunyana Forest Research Station, Chipinge.
 Goldsmith B (1976). The trees of Chirinda forest. Rhod. Sci. News 10:41-50.
 Hoffmann, Annette. Chirinda Forest Reserve in Simbabwe – südlichster tropischer Regenwald Afrikas, afrikascout.de
 Mapaure I (1997). A floristic classification of the vegetation of a forest-savanna boundary in south-eastern Zimbabwe. Bothalia 27(2):185-195.
 Mujuru L, Kundhlande A (2007). Small-scale vegetation structure and composition of Chirinda Forest, southeast Zimbabwe. Afr. J. Ecol. 45:624-632.
 Müller T (1991). Rainforests of Zimbabwe. Unpublished report, National Herbarium and Botanic Garden, Department of Research Specialist Services, Harare.
 Swynnerton, CFM (1918). Some factors in the replacement of the ancient East African forest by wooded pasture land. S. Afr. J. Sci. 14, 493-518 
 Timberlake J (1991). Tour report - Chirinda, Haroni and Rusitu Forests. Internal report, Forest Research Centre, Harare.
 Timberlake J (1992a). Findings from a comparison of aerial photographs of Chirinda forest from 1959 to 1987. Unpublished Report, Forest Research Centre, Harare.
 Timberlake J (1992b). Chirinda Forest: Conservation of a Rainforest in Zimbabwe. Paper presented at the SAREC International Symposium on Ecology and Conservation of Indigenous Forests, July 1992, Victoria Falls, Zimbabwe.
 Timberlake J (1994b). Changes in the extent of moist forest patches in the Eastern Highlands: Case studies based on aerial photographs. Forest Research Paper No. 7. Forestry Commission, Harare.

External links

 Photos of Peawood in the Eastern Highlands, Iziko Museums

Chipinge District
Eastern Highlands
Protected areas of Zimbabwe
Southern Zanzibar–Inhambane coastal forest mosaic
Tropical and subtropical moist broadleaf forests